Caymanabyssia is a genus of small sea snails, marine gastropod mollusks in the family Caymanabyssiidae, the false limpets.

Species
Species within the genus Caymanabyssia include:
 Caymanabyssia fosteri McLean, 1991
 Caymanabyssia rhina B.A. Marshall, 1986
 Caymanabyssia sinespina B.A. Marshall, 1986
 Caymanabyssia solis Kano, Takano, Schwabe & Warén, 2016
 Caymanabyssia spina Moskalev, 1976
 Caymanabyssia vandoverae McLean, 1991

References

 Moskalev, L. I. (1976). On the generic classification in Cocculinidae (Gastropoda, Prosobranchia). Trudy Instituta Okeanologii Imeni P.P. Shirshov 99: 59-70
 McLean, J.H. 1991. Four new pseudococculinid limpets collected by the deep-submersible Alvin in the eastern Pacific. The Veliger 34: 38–47
 Marshall, B.A. (1986 ["1985"]). Recent and Tertiary Cocculinidae and Pseudococculinidae (Mollusca: Gastropoda) from New Zealand and New South Wales. New Zealand Journal of Zoology. 12(4): 505-546

External links
 To GenBank 
 To ITIS
 To World Register of Marine Species

Caymanabyssiidae